Teguise, also known in Spanish as La Villa de Teguise, is a village in the municipality of Teguise in the north-central part of the island of Lanzarote in Las Palmas province in the Canary Islands.  The town's population is 1,776 as of 1 January 2018.

The town is the capital of the municipality of Teguise.

A market is held in the town on Sunday mornings, and has become a popular tourist attraction.

History
The town was founded in 1414. Teguise served as the capital of the Kingdom of the Canary Islands from 1425 to 1448 and as capital of the island until the capital moved to Arrecife in 1852.

References

External links
Teguise: white heritage and mahogany crosses in the old capital of Lanzarote 

1414 establishments
Populated places established in the 1410s
Populated places in Lanzarote
Capitals of former nations
15th-century establishments in Castile
15th-century establishments in Africa